Lew Cody (born Louis Joseph Côté; February 22, 1884 – May 31, 1934) was an American stage and film actor whose career spanned the silent film and early sound film age. He gained notoriety in the late 1910s for playing "male vamps" in films such as Don't Change Your Husband.

Early life and career
Cody was born on February 22, 1884 (some sources say 1885) to Louis Joseph Côté and Elizabeth Sarah Côté (née Herbert). His father was French Canadian, with his ancestral lineage dating back to France and Germany, and his mother was a native of Maine. Cody and his younger brothers and sisters were born in Waterville, Maine. After Elizabeth's death, Louis remarried to Marie Lena Rose Toussaint, and they had a daughter named Cecile Côté.

The family moved to Berlin, New Hampshire, where Cody's father owned a drug store. In his youth, Cody worked at his father's drug store as a soda jerk. He later enrolled at McGill University in Montreal where he intended to study medicine but abandoned the idea of setting up in practice and joined a theatre stock company in North Carolina.

He made his debut on the stage in New York in Pierre of the Plains. Cody moved to Los Angeles and began a minor film career at The Balboa Film Studios with Thomas Ince.  Cody had at least 99 film credits from 1914 to 1934.

Personal life
Cody was married three times. His first two marriages were to actress Dorothy Dalton. They first married in 1910 and divorced in 1911. They remarried in 1913 and were divorced a second time in 1914.
Playing the debonnaire leading man, Cody enjoyed the later single life of "a man's man", which added to his acting persona. In what may have been started as a mutual lark, Cody married Mabel Normand in 1926. Having pre-med schooling, Cody understood that Mabel had acute tuberculosis and they lived separately and attended all he possibly could to Mabel's comfort. They remained married until Normand's death from  tuberculosis in February 1930.

Death
After Mabel's passing, he successfully transitioned into talking pictures and to even better roles.
On May 31, 1934, Cody died of a sudden heart attack in his sleep at his home in Beverly Hills, California. He is buried in St. Peter's Cemetery, Lewiston, Maine, in the family plot.

Partial filmography

References

External links 

 
 
 
 Photographs and literature on Lew Cody

1884 births
1934 deaths
20th-century American male actors
American male film actors
American male stage actors
American male silent film actors
American people of French-Canadian descent
Burials in Maine
Male actors from Maine
Male actors from New Hampshire
McGill University Faculty of Medicine alumni
People from Berlin, New Hampshire
People from Waterville, Maine